James Harkin may refer to:

 James Bernard Harkin (1875–1955), Canadian conservationist
 James Harkin (podcaster), British podcaster
 Jim Harkin (1913–1988), English professional footballer